The 1996 Gent–Wevelgem was the 58th edition of the Gent–Wevelgem cycle race and was held on 10 April 1996. The race started in Ghent and finished in Wevelgem. The race was won by Tom Steels of the Mapei team.

General classification

References

Gent–Wevelgem
1996 in road cycling
1996 in Belgian sport